Ambrose "Rowdy" Gaines IV (born February 17, 1959) is an American former competitive swimmer, U.S. Olympic Hall of Fame member, three-time Olympic gold medalist, and member of the International Swimming Hall of Fame. He is a swimming analyst for television network NBC. He has covered swimming at the Olympic Games since 1992 in Barcelona.

Early life
Gaines was born in Winter Haven, Florida, to Jettie Ann and Ambrose "Buddy" Gaines, who met there as water skiers at Cypress Gardens in the 1950s. Gaines tried several sports during his teenage years, but turned to swimming as a Winter Haven High School junior at age 17. He received a swimming scholarship to Auburn University. At Auburn, he became a five-time NCAA champion under the training of head coach Richard Quick.

Career
From 1978 to 1984, Gaines set 10 world records. At the time he was the world record holder in the 100-meter and 200-meter freestyles. The 1980 boycott prevented Gaines from competing at the 1980 Moscow Olympics. Gaines said the boycott came at a time when he considered himself at his peak, and that he believed he missed an opportunity for four gold medals.

Gaines qualified for the 1984 Summer Olympics in Los Angeles, California. He won gold in the 100-meter freestyle and two gold medals for relays, swimming the anchor legs for the U.S. team in the 4×100-meter freestyle relay and 4×100-meter medley relay.

Gaines said he experienced mental-health issues after missing out on the 1980 Games and had "some real trouble post-Olympics, and...some big struggles, especially the year after."

Commentating
He began covering  swimming for NBC at the Atlanta 1996 Summer Olympics. He also was the analyst at the Sydney 2000 Summer Olympics, the Athens 2004 Summer Olympics, the Beijing 2008 Summer Olympics, the London 2012 Summer Olympics, the Rio 2016 Summer Olympics, and the Tokyo 2020 Summer Olympics held in 2021.

At the 2011 Short Course Masters Nationals, Gaines broke his national record in the 50–54 division 50 yard freestyle (21.36). On July 16, 2011, Gaines broke the 50–54 Age Group record in the long course 100m freestyle with a time of 54.6. 

Gaines is the executive director of Rowdy’s Kidz, a wellness initiative developed and supported by The Limu Company that reaches out to children across the country.

Gaines and his wife, Judy, reside in Lake Mary, Florida, with their four daughters.

Awards
 International Swimming Hall of Fame
 U.S. Olympic Hall of Fame
 Alabama Sports Hall of Fame
 Florida Sports Hall of Fame
 Southeastern Conference Athlete of the Year 1981
 1982 McDonald's Spirit Award
 2007 NCAA Silver Anniversary Award

See also
 List of members of the International Swimming Hall of Fame
 List of Auburn University people
 List of multiple Olympic gold medalists
 List of multiple Olympic gold medalists at a single Games
 List of Olympic medalists in swimming (men)
 List of World Aquatics Championships medalists in swimming (men)
 World record progression 50 metres freestyle
 World record progression 100 metres freestyle
 World record progression 200 metres freestyle
 World record progression 4 × 100 metres freestyle relay
 World record progression 4 × 100 metres medley relay
 World record progression 4 × 200 metres freestyle relay

References

Bibliography 
 Caraccioli, Jerry, & Tom Caraccioli, Boycott: Stolen Dreams of the 1980 Moscow Olympic Games, New Chapter Press, Washington, D.C. (2009).  .
 De George, Matthew,  Pooling Talent: Swimming's Greatest Teams, Rowman & Littlefield, Lanham, Maryland (2014).  .

External links 

 
 Gaines' Sports Illustrated 50th Anniversary essay
 
 
 

1959 births
Living people
American male freestyle swimmers
American television sports announcers
Auburn Tigers men's swimmers
World record setters in swimming
Olympic gold medalists for the United States in swimming
Swimmers from Florida
Swimmers at the 1979 Pan American Games
Swimmers at the 1983 Pan American Games
Swimmers at the 1984 Summer Olympics
World Aquatics Championships medalists in swimming
Medalists at the 1984 Summer Olympics
Pan American Games gold medalists for the United States
Pan American Games bronze medalists for the United States
Pan American Games medalists in swimming
People from Lake Mary, Florida
People with Guillain–Barré syndrome
Sportspeople from Winter Haven, Florida
Swimming commentators
Medalists at the 1979 Pan American Games
Medalists at the 1983 Pan American Games